George Pomutz (in Romanian: Gheorghe Pomuț, in Hungarian: Pomucz György or Pomutz György; May 31, 1818 – October 12, 1882) was a Romanian-American officer during the Hungarian Revolution of 1848 against the Habsburgs, a general in the Union Army in the American Civil War, a lawyer, and a diplomat.

Early life
George Pomutz was born in the Kingdom of Hungary, Austrian Empire, in the town of Gyula (Romanian: Giula), Békés county, to ethnic Romanian orthodox parents Ioan (son of Dica, metalsmith) and Victoria, the family originally from Négyfalu (Săcele, Siebendörfer), near Brassó (Brașov, Kronstadt) in Transylvania, settling in Gyula during the second half of the 18th century. His baptism record was registered under no. 63 at the Romanian orthodox church Sfântul Nicolae, located in Miklosvaros (Nagy román város / Big Romanian town), situated in the NE part of Gyula; it also notes that a copy of this document was solicited and obtained from the church on June 27, 1857. He received his primary and secondary education in Hungary, followed by the Military Academy in Vienna and Military Academy Saint Etienne (France). He spoke about 5-6 language and later specialized in France where he became a royal prosecutor. He served as a captain in the failed Hungarian Revolution of 1848. Afterwards, in 1849, he emigrated to the United States; arriving in New York on February 24, 1850, alongside 20 acquaintances. The group of immigrants, Romanians and Hungarians, settled around the town of Keokuk, Iowa, founding a settlement named New Buda located south of the town of Burlington. George Pomutz became a U.S. citizen on March 15, 1855. He purchased land and a mining concession, the 1860 U.S. Census finding him living in Decatur, Iowa.

Civil War
At the beginning of the Civil War, Pomutz enrolled in the Union Army as a first lieutenant in the 15th Iowa Infantry Regiment. He was wounded at the Battle of Shiloh. In May 1864, after Pomutz had commanded the provisional Iowa Battalion, Maj. Gen. Francis P. Blair appointed Pomutz as Provost Marshal of his XVII Corps. In August 1864, Pomutz returned to the 15th Iowa Infantry, which he commanded in the Battle of Atlanta.

On May 4, 1866, President Andrew Johnson nominated Pomutz for appointment to the grade of brevet brigadier general of volunteers, to rank from March 13, 1865, and the United States Senate confirmed the appointment on May 18, 1866.

Postbellum career
After the end of the Civil War, Pomutz returned to Keokuk. On February 16, 1866, he was appointed Consul of the United States in Saint Petersburg, Imperial Russia, serving in that capacity until September 30, 1870. During that period, he was involved in the negotiations for the Alaska Purchase. Later he became the American consul general in Saint Petersburg, serving from June 17, 1874, until his death there, in 1882. He was buried in Smolensky Cemetery, Saint Petersburg, Russia but his grave seems to have disappeared, possibly after the re-purposing of cemetery lands by the Bolsheviks, after the 1917 Russian Revolution.

Legacy
The Liberty ship SS George Pomutz was named after him. Launched August 3, 1944, the ship served till 1970.

On August 14, 2004, a statue of Pomutz was unveiled at the Dormition of the Theotokos Cathedral in Cleveland, Ohio.

A street in Timișoara, Romania bears his name.

Quotation

From  the address by Emil Constantinescu, President of Romania, at a Joint Meeting of the United States Congress, July 15, 1998:

See also

 Nicolae Dunca
 List of American Civil War brevet generals (Union)

References

Further reading

 Demetrius Dvoichenko-Markov (1955), A Rumanian Priest in Colonial America,  American Slavic and East European Review, Vol. 14, No. 3. (October, 1955), pp. 383–389. 
 Fillman, George (1996), George Pomutz: A Romanian soldier of distinction in the American Civil War, 1861-1865,

External links

 History of Iowa's 15th Volunteer Regiment
 15th Iowa Infantry Roster – Civil War
 Oldest Romanian Orthodox Parish in US Marks 100 Years of Ministry, Orthodox News, Vol. 6, No. 34, August 24, 2004
 His pension card
 Gheorghe Pomuţ, românul care a întregit graniţele S.U.A. 
 George Pomut, American hero 

Union Army officers
People of Iowa in the American Civil War
Ambassadors of the United States to Russia
People of the Revolutions of 1848
Romanian emigrants to the United States
Hungarian emigrants to the United States
People from Gyula
1818 births
1882 deaths